Estadio Municipal Federico Schwager is a multi-use stadium in Coronel, Chile. It's currently used mostly for football matches and is the home stadium of Lota Schwager. The stadium holds 5,700 people and was built in 1945.

Federico Schwager
Sports venues in Biobío Region